Pejman Bazeghi (born 10 August 1974) is an Iranian actor ,TV  presenter and model who rose to fame in 2004 by acting in "Duel" .

Biography 
Bazeghi was born on August 10, 1974 in Tehran, Iran to an ethnic Persian family. He is the second child of a family of five, with an origin from the Northern part of Iran, Lahijan. During his childhood, due to his father’s job, he moved and lived in different cities which gave him a lot of experience for his future. After the Islamic revolution, when he was only four years old, his family moved to Rasht. During Iran’s war with Iraq because his father became one of the guardians to defend southern sea borders of Iran, his family moved to Boushehr. After the war and his family’s return to Tehran, Pejman got accepted in the Islamic Azad University, Lahijan Branch and moved there to continue his education in the field of Mining engineering. It was there that he got interested in cinema and acting.
In 1994, he entered the central youth cinema of Gilan and acted in his first film called Eteraf, directed by Majid fahimkhah. After that, he acted in his first television series, Azhanse Doosti, for about two years, where he got the chance of working alongside Hossein Panahi. He became a more prominent actor in 2004 after starring in the film Duel, which won six awards at the 22nd Fajr International Film Festival.

Filmography

Film

Home Video

Television 
 Paytakht directed by Siroos Moghaddam in 2012
 Friendly Agency directed by Ahmad Ramezanzadeh
 This is Not a Court directed by Asghar Tavasoli
 The Elite Group directed by Mehrdad Khoshbakht
 Under the City's Skin directed by Mehran Ghafourian
 The Lost directed by Rambod Javan
 The Sea People directed by Syrouse Moghadam
 The Passing of Love directed by Mohamadreza Ahan
 The Edge of Darkness
 Mard-e Hezar-Chehreh directed by Mehran Modiri in 2008
 Marde Do Hezar Chehreh directed by Mehran Modiri in 2009
 In Search of Peace directed by saeed soltani in 2016-2017
 Love in Persian
 Gando directed by Javad Afsha in 2019
 Maple directed by Behrang Tofighi in 2021

See also 
 Iranian cinema

References

External links

1974 births
Living people
Male actors from Tehran
Iranian male film actors
Iranian male television actors
Amirkabir University of Technology alumni